St. Laurence's Church, Saint Lawrence's Church, or variations on those names or spellings, may refer to:

Australia 
 Christ Church St Laurence, Sydney

Austria
 Basilica of St. Lawrence, Enns

Denmark
 St. Lawrence's Church, Roskildem Roman Catholic church in Roskilde
 St. Lawrence's Church, former church in Roskilde og which only the tower survuces

Finland 
 Church of St. Lawrence, Vantaa
 Church of St. Lawrence, Lohja

France 
 St. Lawrence Church, Saint-Laurent-du-Maroni, French Guiana

Germany 
 St. Laurentii, Itzehoe
 St. Lorenz Basilica, Kempten, Bavaria
 St. Lorenz, Nuremberg, Bavaria

Ireland
St Laurence's Church, Rathmore, County Meath

Italy
San Lorenzo Martire, Lazzate, Lombardy

Malta  
 Saint Lawrence's Church, Vittoriosa, Birgu

Netherlands 
 Grote of Sint-Laurenskerk, Rotterdam
 Grote or Sint-Laurenskerk, Alkmaar

Pakistan 
 St. Lawrence's Church, Karachi

Poland 
 St. Lawrence's Church, Warsaw

Portugal  
 Church of São Lourenço (Almancil)

Sri Lanka 
 St. Lawrence's Church, Wellawatte

Sweden 
 St. Lawrence's Church, Söderköping

Ukraine 
 St. Lawrence's Church, Zhovkva

United Kingdom

England 
Bedfordshire
 Church of St Lawrence, Wymington

Berkshire
 St Laurence's Church, Reading
 Church of St Laurence, Upton-cum-Chalvey, Slough

Birmingham
 St Lawrence's Church, Duddeston
 St Laurence's Church, Northfield

Buckinghamshire
 St Lawrence's Church, Broughton
 St Lawrence's Church, West Wycombe

Cambridgeshire
 St Laurence's Church, Cambridge
 St Lawrence Parish Church, Foxton, Cambridgeshire

Cheshire
 St Laurence's Church, Frodsham
 St Lawrence's Church, Over Peover
 St Lawrence's Church, Stoak

City of London
 St Lawrence Jewry

Cumbria
 St Lawrence's Church, Appleby
 St Lawrence's Church, Crosby Ravensworth
 St Laurence's Church, Morland

Derbyshire
 St Lawrence's Church, Eyam
 St. Laurence's Church, Long Eaton
 St Lawrence's Church, North Wingfield
 St Lawrence's Church, Walton-on-Trent
 St Lawrence's Church, Whitwell

East Sussex
 St Laurence's Church, Guestling

Essex
 St Laurence's Church, Blackmore
 St Laurence and All Saints Church, Eastwood

Gloucestershire
 St Lawrence Church, Lechlade
St Lawrence's Church, Sandhurst

Greater London
 St Lawrence Church, Morden
 Church of St Laurence, Upminster
 St. Lawrence's church, Whitchurch

Greater Manchester
 St Lawrence's Church, Denton

Hampshire
 Church of St Lawrence, Alton
 St Lawrence's Church, Weston Patrick
 St Lawrence Church, Winchester

Kent
 St Lawrence's Church, Mereworth
 Church of St Laurence, Ramsgate

Isle of Wight
 St Lawrence's Church, St Lawrence

Lancashire
 St Lawrence's Church, Barton
 St Laurence's Church, Chorley
 St Laurence's Church, Morecambe

Lincolnshire
 St Lawrence's Church, Snarford

Norfolk
 St Laurence's Church, Norwich
 St Lawrence Church, South Walsham

Northamptonshire
 Church of St Laurence, Stanwick
 St Lawrence's Church, Long Buckby

Northumberland
 Church of St Lawrence, Warkworth

North Yorkshire
 St Lawrence's Church, York

Nottinghamshire
 St Laurence's Church, Gonalston
 St Lawrence's Church, Gotham
 St. Laurence's Church, Norwell
 St. Lawrence's Church, Thorpe

Oxfordshire
 St Laurence's Church, Combe Longa

Shropshire
 St Laurence's Church, Church Stretton
 St Laurence's Church, Ludlow

Somerset
 Church of St Laurence, East Harptree
 Church of St Lawrence, Lydeard St Lawrence
 Church of St Lawrence, Priddy
 Church of St Lawrence, Rode
 Church of St Lawrence, Stanton Prior

South Yorkshire
 Church of St Laurence, Adwick le Street

Staffordshire
 St Lawrence's Church, Coppenhall
 St Lawrence's Church, Gnosall

Suffolk
 St Lawrence Church, Ipswich

Surrey
 Church of St Lawrence, Chobham

West Midlands
 St Laurence Church, Meriden

Wiltshire
 St Laurence's Church, Bradford-on-Avon
 St Lawrence, Stratford-sub-Castle, Salisbury

Worcestershire
 St Lawrence's Church, Evesham

United States 
 St. Lawrence Catholic Church (Otter Creek, Iowa)
 St. Lawrence Arts Center in Portland, Maine
 Minor Basilica of St. Lawrence the Deacon and Martyr in Asheville, North Carolina
 St. Lawrence Church (Cincinnati), Ohio
 St. Laurence Church in Upper Darby, Pennsylvania
 St. Lawrence Catholic Church (Stangelville, Wisconsin)
 St. Lawrence Catholic Church (Utica, Michigan)

See also 
 Basilica of St. Lawrence (disambiguation)
 St. Lawrence Cathedral (disambiguation)
 Saint Lawrence (disambiguation)